Mount Donna Buang is a mountain in the southern reaches of the Victorian Alps of the Great Dividing Range, located in the Australian state of Victoria.

Location and features

In winter, it usually receives snow suitable for snowplay and tobogganing, and during the non-winter months the area is well visited by bushwalkers and cyclists. The summit of Mount Donna Buang is surrounded by alpine ash (or woollybutt) trees and sub-alpine snow gums, and at nearby Cement Creek there is a canopy walkway through myrtle beech and mountain ash trees known as the Mount Donna Buang Skywalk.

Mount Donna Buang is part of the Yarra Ranges National Park (established in 1995). The nearest serviced town to the mountain is Warburton.

Flora and fauna

The lower and middle slopes of the mountain are characterised by very tall forests of mountain ash with a cool temperate rainforest mid story on the southern slopes and sheltered areas elsewhere on the mountain. Trees such as myrtle beech, sassafras and soft tree fern as well as large shrubs like hazel pomaderris are fairly common in this zone. On the higher slopes sub-alpine species such as woollybutt and snowgum predominate, although myrtle beech is also common almost to the summit.

It contains a number of native mammals including the rare Leadbeater's possum, and is home to 120 species of native birds. Some examples include the pink robin, yellow-tailed black cockatoo and the crimson rosella.

The Mount Donna Buang wingless stonefly is endemic to the area. Mount Donna Buang is the type locality of the velvet worm Ooperipatus centunculus.

History

In the 1860s, “Mount Acland” was the name given to the 1,250m high mountain by a Police Magistrate called Joseph Anderson Panton. The name it has today, “Mount Donna Buang”, probably came from the Wurundjeri.
 
A walking track to the summit of Mount Donna Buang was cut during the 1890s and the much wider Donna Buang Bridle Track, which the current road from Warburton to the top of Mount Donna Buang follows, was opened in 1912.

Federal government minister Lee Batchelor suffered a fatal heart attack while climbing Mount Donna Buang in 1911.

Timber from the mountain was harvested from the early 1900s to the mid 1920s with seven cable hauled tramways moving logs from the Ben Cairn - Donna Buang ridge down to sawmills near Warburton. While the forest has regrown and the mountain appears to have never been logged, relics such as tram rails and cables can still be found in the forest.

From 1925 to the early 1950s Mt Donna Buang was a popular ski resort. It had four ski lodges, day visitor shelters, cafes, a ski hire, a ski jump and six runs cut through forests of myrtle beech and woollybutt. For over 20 years it had thousands of visitors every weekend there was snow. However, the runs were fairly short and the snow cover was always erratic, so after the Second World War, better transport meant it lost out to higher ski resorts further from Melbourne, although the mountain remained popular with family snow play groups.

Cycling
The road from Warburton to Mount Donna Buang is a challenging cycling route, averaging 6.2% over 16.6 km and has also become a popular destination for recreational driving, motorcycling, and in the summer a challenging training route for endurance cyclists and triathletes.

The main public roads on Mt Donna Buang are:
 Donna Buang Road, sealed from Warburton to a bit past the Mount Donna Buang Summit Road junction.
 Acheron Way, joining Donna Buang Road about halfway up, leads to Marysville. It is sealed except for a 12 kilometre section in the middle.
 Don Road runs from Healesville to the Warburton Highway between Yarra Junction and Launching Place. It connects with Donna Buang Road, and is unsealed for much of its length.

See also

Alpine National Park

References

External links

 Donna Buang: the forgotten ski resort A history of Mt Donna Buang
 parkweb.vic.gov.au - mt-donna-buang-summit
 Warburton Valley official website
 Snow report
 WarburtonInfo Mt Donna Snow Info
 Tour of the Summit of Mount Donna Buang
 

Donna Buang
Victorian Alps